= Pavlo Tsyrkunenko =

Ukrainian footballer

Personal information
- Full name: Pavlo Oleksandrovych Tsyrkunenko
- Date of birth: 10 July 1991 (age 35)
- Place of birth: Kiev, Ukrainian SSR
- Height: 2.02 m (6 ft 7 1/2 in)
- Position: Defender

Youth career
- 2005: FC Vidradnyi Kyiv
- 2005–2006: Youth Sportive School #15 Kyiv
- 2007: FC Vidradnyi Kyiv
- 2008: FC Volyn Lutsk

Senior career*
Years	Team	Apps	(Gls)
2008–2014	FC Volyn Lutsk	12	(1)
- * Club domestic league appearances and goals

Pavlo Tsyrkunenko (Ukrainian: Павло Олександрович Циркуненко; born 10 July 1991) is a professional Ukrainian football defender who played for the Ukrainian Premier League club Volyn Lutsk.

== Career ==
Tsyrkunenko attended the different Sportive youth schools in Kyiv. He made his debut for FC Volyn Lutsk played as substituted in the game against FC CSKA Kyiv on 18 April 2008 in Ukrainian First League.
